Jonathan Walukana Wafula (born 17 June 1994) is a Kenyan footballer who plays as a forward for Northern Premier League side Matlock Town

Early life
Wafula was born in Kenya and at aged 10 moved to England. His family settled in Matlock, Derbyshire and then in Alfreton. When he first moved to England, he had no real interest in football and only started playing the game when he left school and attended college.

Career
Wafula began his career with Chesterfield and made his professional debut on 12 January 2013 in a 3–0 victory against Northampton Town.

In 2014, he signed for Worksop Town.

He then signed for Shaw Lane.

In May 2017 he signed for Gainsborough Trinity.

In February 2018, Wafula signed for National League North club Boston United.

On 10 August 2020, Wafula signed for fellow National League North side Guiseley.

He signed for Northern Premier League Premier Division side Matlock Town on a free transfer in July 2021.

On 14 September 2021, Wafula signed for Grantham Town.

References

External links

1994 births
Living people
People from Alfreton
Footballers from Derbyshire
Kenyan footballers
Association football forwards
Chesterfield F.C. players
Worksop Town F.C. players
Shaw Lane A.F.C. players
Gainsborough Trinity F.C. players
Boston United F.C. players
Guiseley A.F.C. players
Matlock Town F.C. players
Grantham Town F.C. players
English Football League players
National League (English football) players
Northern Premier League players